Daniel Zvidzai (born 3 January 1999) is a Zimbabwean cricketer. He made his List A debut on 4 February 2020, for Rangers in the 2019–20 Pro50 Championship. He made his first-class debut on 20 February 2020, for Rangers in the 2019–20 Logan Cup.

References

External links
 

1999 births
Living people
Zimbabwean cricketers
Rangers cricketers